Hiltpoltstein is a market village in the district of Forchheim in Bavaria in Germany. At its centre is Hiltpoltstein Castle.

References

Forchheim (district)